Alfarizi is a surname. Notable people with the surname include:

Johan Alfarizi (born 1990), Indonesian footballer
Maqdis Shalim Alfarizi (born 1989), Indonesian footballer